Ifako International Schools are co-education schools founded in 1974 in Ifako-Ijaiye Ifako, Lagos, Nigeria. It provides nursery, primary and secondary education systems.

History
In 1975 the school graduated the first form one students. In 1978, Ifako International Schools were approved to run secondary school programs by Lagos State Government. From 1982 to 1983, Lagos state government policy prevented the school from participating in School Leaving certificate examinations, though from 1984 onward, the school has been participating in the examinations.

External links
  Official Website

Schools in Lagos
Educational institutions established in 1974
1974 establishments in Nigeria
International schools in Nigeria